The Epiphany of Glenn Jones is an album by American fingerstyle guitarist and composer John Fahey and the alternative rock/post-rock band Cul de Sac, released in 1997.

History

The project initially began with Geffen Records and was to be a collaboration between Fahey and young musicians influenced by his earlier work. When this idea later collapsed, Thirsty Ear Records producer Peter Gordon assembled the Cul de Sac/Fahey project. Cul de Sac had previously covered Fahey's song "The Portland Cement Factory at Monolith California" on their debut album Ecim.

Glenn Jones, the band's leader and guitarist, became interested and influenced by Fahey's early music while still in high school. He describes the band's project with Fahey in great detail in the original liner notes. The rehearsals and sessions were the source of friction between Fahey and the band.  Jones later called the making of the album an "ordeal" and described the relationships between the two parties as "musical antagonism". Fahey later claimed to have erased all the early tapes of the music Cul de Sac brought to the sessions, a claim Jones refutes in subsequent interviews.

The final two tracks are spoken word recordings.

The sessions also mark the first appearance of The Great Koonaklaster, an Art Deco object Fahey acquired, named, and placed in the studio to bring focus to the sessions. It later appeared as the title of the Fahey tribute album The Great Koonaklaster Speaks: A John Fahey Celebration.

Reception

Music critic Tad Hendrickson stated "The Epiphany Of Glenn Jones is a somber sound collage where Fahey's crisp acoustic playing and odd washes of sound are mated with atmospherics as varied as birds chirping and Cul De Sac's usual organ-drenched instrumental style."

In his review of Cul de Sac's release ECIM, music critic Michael Patrick Brady referred to The Epiphany of Glenn Jones as "a tremendous effort, stretching the quiet, minimalist Fahey beyond his typical comfort zone and into new and often unsettling realms, light-years apart from his solo explorations."

Critic Joe Garden referred to the disharmony of the collaborators while calling the final product "a work of brilliance, and a credit to both the artists who made it and the label with the guts to back such a decidedly risky venture." and wrote "The surprising thing about [it] is that it is the sound of artists giving up on planned material and succumbing to chance."

Track listing
 "Tuff" (Ace Cannon) – 5:05
 "Gamelan Collage" (John Fahey) – 10:10
 "The New Red Pony" (Fahey) – 5:51
 "Maggie Campbell Blues" (Tommy Johnson, Public Domain) – 3:16
 "Our Puppet Selves" (Cul De Sac, Glenn Jones) – 8:20
 "Gamelan Guitar" (Fahey) – 5:27
 "Come On in My Kitchen" (Robert Johnson) – 4:06
 "Magic Mountain" (Fahey) – 9:00
 "More Nothing" (Fahey, Jones) – 6:37
 "Nothing" (Fahey) – 15:49

Personnel
John Fahey – acoustic guitar, electric lap steel guitars, tapes
Glenn Jones – guitar
Chris Fujiwara – bass
Jon Proudman – drums
Robin Amos – electronics
Jon Williams – tapes
Production notes:
Jon Williams – producer, engineer

References

External links
Former Cul de Sac guitarist Glenn Jones talks about the good, the bad and the ugly parts of John Fahey's legacy

1997 albums
Cul de Sac (band) albums
John Fahey (musician) albums
Thirsty Ear Recordings albums